Giovanni Lodetti (born 10 August 1942) is an Italian former professional footballer who played as a midfielder. A hard-working player, he usually supported his more creative teammates defensively, excelling as a defensive midfielder due to his stamina and his ability to read the game. Despite his supporting role in midfield, he also possessed good technique and creativity, as well as an eye for goal, which also saw him participate in his teams attacking moves.

Club career 
Lodetti is mostly remembered for his time as a defensive midfielder with Italian club Milan, with which he achieved great domestic and international success in the 60s alongside playmaker Gianni Rivera, winning two Serie A titles (the first during his debut season), a Coppa Italia, two European Cups, a Cup Winners' Cup, and an Intercontinental Cup. He later also played for Sampdoria, Foggia, and Novara, before retiring in 1978.

International career 
Lodetti also represented the Italian national side at the 1966 World Cup in England, where they were eliminated in the first round. He was also a member of the national squad in Italy's victorious UEFA Euro 1968 campaign on home soil. Although he was set to participate in the 1970 World Cup, in which Italy reached the final, he was dropped last minute due to an injury to Anastasi, which led manager Ferruccio Valcareggi to call up Roberto Boninsegna and Pierino Prati in his place. In total he represented his national team 17 times between 1964 and 1968, scoring two goals. He also represented the under-21 side in their victorious campaign at the 1963 Mediterranean games.

Honours

Club 
A.C. Milan
Serie A: 1961–62, 1967–68
Coppa Italia: 1966–67
European Cup: 1962–63, 1968–69
Cup Winners' Cup: 1967–68
Intercontinental Cup: 1969

International 
Italy
UEFA European Football Championship: 1968

Individual 
A.C. Milan Hall of Fame

References

External links 
Profile at MagliaRossonera.it 
Profile at EmozioneCalcio.it 
International caps at FIGC.it 

1942 births
Living people
Sportspeople from the Metropolitan City of Milan
Association football midfielders
Italian footballers
Serie A players
Serie B players
A.C. Milan players
U.C. Sampdoria players
Calcio Foggia 1920 players
Novara F.C. players
Italy international footballers
UEFA European Championship-winning players
1966 FIFA World Cup players
UEFA Euro 1968 players
Mediterranean Games gold medalists for Italy
Mediterranean Games medalists in football
Competitors at the 1963 Mediterranean Games
UEFA Champions League winning players
Footballers from Lombardy